tre
The Yokosuka MXY1 was an experimental aircraft built by the Watanabe Iron Works  to a design from the Yokosuka Navy Technical Arsenal from 1937.

Development
At the end of 1935, the Air Service Command of the Imperial Japanese Navy commissioned the Yokosuka Navy Technical Arsenal to carry out aerodynamic research with a parasol monoplane similar to the Parnall Parasol, but not related. The aircraft was built by Watababe, starting in November 1937 and completed by September 1938.

Receiving the designation "MXY1" (M (Special Purpose), X (Experimental), Y (Yokosho)), it was a parasol monoplane with a large glazed cabin, accommodating the pilot and 3 or 4 flight test observers. The aircraft was powered by a  Nakajima Hikari 1 kai engine with a long-chord NACA cowling. Rectangular wings were supported by large struts and the wheels of the strutted undercarriage were enclosed in large spats.

The tests showed poor performance of the aircraft, as well as a serious problem with vibration of the aircraft. Several months of work were spent on fixing deficiencies, but in the end the aircraft was abandoned, with parts being used in other research. 

In parallel, work was conducted on almost identical MXY2, but due to the closure of the project, development was axed.

Specifications

References

External links
 a photo of the MXY1
 another pic

1930s Japanese experimental aircraft
MXY1